The George Washington University is one of the largest United States private universities in terms of enrollment. Almost 10,000 undergraduates attend George Washington. GW has residence halls on two of its three campuses. The Foggy Bottom campus is the university's main campus, where most of the residence halls can be found, in an urban setting. Also in Washington's Foxhall neighborhood is the Mount Vernon campus, formerly the Mount Vernon College for Women. The Mount Vernon campus provides a more suburban residential setting.

Foggy Bottom
There are over 26 residences at the Foggy Bottom campus. Residences come in residence halls, or dormitories, and townhouses. Some residence halls were originally constructed as hotels and apartment buildings. The current residences on the Foggy Bottom campus vary in age; some residences were built in the 1920s and the newest, District House at 2121 H Street, opened in August 2016. Hattie M. Strong Hall is a women's only residence found on 21st Street, between G and H Streets. I (Eye) Street residences such as Munson and JBKO are very close to the Foggy Bottom–GWU Washington Metro station, which is also right next to George Washington University Hospital.

The following is a list of residence halls found on the Foggy Bottom campus:

Mount Vernon
The following is a list of residence halls found on the Mount Vernon campus:

References

External links
GW Housing Website
Official website
Foggy Bottom Campus Map
Mount Vernon Campus Map
The GW and Foggy Bottom Historical Encyclopedia

Foggy Bottom
George Washington University buildings and structures